West Bromwich Dartmouth Cricket Club is an amateur cricket club in West Bromwich, West Midlands, England. Founded in 1834 it is a founder member of the Birmingham & District Cricket league. Its First XI currently plays in the Premier Division, and its Second XI in the First Division. The Third XI play in the First Division of the Staffordshire Clubs Cricket Championship and the Fourth XI in the Fourth Division. The First XI is captained by former Gloucestershire batsman Kadeer Ali, brother of England international Moeen Ali.

The unusual name "Dartmouth" comes from the original ground residing in the estate of the Earl of Dartmouth – Sandwell Hall. They now play their home games at Sandwell Park, West Bromwich (also within the Earl's old estate), next to Sandwell Park Golf Club and almost opposite The Hawthorns, home to football team, West Bromwich Albion.

They were runners-up to fellow Birmingham League team Old Hill, in the 1993 national club knockout cup final.

Birmingham & District Cricket league Honours
Premier Division Champions. 1st XI
1930 1932 1934 1941 1942 1943 1944 1945 1948 1953 1955 1958 1965 1971 1974 1993 2014
Joint Champions 1890 1933

Division One Champions. 1st XI
2003

Premier Division Champions. 2nd XI
1905 1929 1963 1965 1970 1972 1973 1974 1998

Division One Champions. 2nd XI
2004

Challenge Cup Champions
1969 1970 1972 1989 1990 1992 1993 1994 1997

English club cricket teams
Cricket clubs established in 1834
1834 establishments in England
West Bromwich
Sport in Sandwell

External links 

 Papers of Lionel King, who managed the Third XI during the 1990s, University of Birmingham